Ausubel is a surname. Notable people with the surname include:

 David Ausubel (1918–2008), American psychologist
 Jesse H. Ausubel, American environmental scientist and program manager
 Kenny Ausubel, American author, investigative journalist and filmmaker
 Nathan Ausubel, American historian, folklorist and humorist 
 Frederick M. Ausubel, American Molecular Biologist

Jewish surnames